Jarreh-ye Mian (also Romanized as Jarreh-ye Mīān, Jarreh-e Meyān, and Jarreh-i-Miyān; also known as Jarmīān and Jarreh-ye Vostá) is a village in Vahdatiyeh Rural District, Sadabad District, Dashtestan County, Bushehr Province, Iran. At the 2006 census, its population was 172, in 39 families.

References 

Populated places in Dashtestan County